Remix'5 is a Candan Erçetin album. It features remixes of songs from her album entitled Melek. There's also a song from "Les Choristes" movie, 'Sevdim Anladım'.

Track listing

Candan Erçetin albums
2005 remix albums